Murgantia violascens is a species of stink bug in the family Pentatomidae. It is found in the Caribbean Sea, North America, and South America.

References

Articles created by Qbugbot
Insects described in 1837
Pentatomini